is a Japanese television drama series that aired on NTV from 6 July to 14 September 2011.

Cast
 Makiko Esumi as Tamami Ōdate
 Goro Inagaki as Junnosuke Nakura
 Fumiyo Kohinata as Nobuo Takeda
 Sakura as Ayame Matsuoka
 Bro.TOM as Kōhei Narumi
 Magy as Kengo Yashiro
 Mirai Shida as Mia Takeda
 Takurō Ōno as Shunsuke Fujimura
 Satomi Ishihara as Chika Kamatsuda
 Narushi Ikeda as Kōji Izumi
 Kenji Anan as Yoshihiko Kamioka

References

External links
  
  
 

2011 Japanese television series debuts
2011 Japanese television series endings
Japanese drama television series
Nippon TV dramas